A constitutional referendum was held in the Northern Mariana Islands on 6 November 2012, alongside the election for the islands' representative to the United States House of Representatives. Voters were asked whether they approved of three proposed amendments to the constitution. All three were approved.

Background
One of the three proposals was for the government to issue bonds to pay for the country's pension scheme, a proposal which had been rejected in a 2010 referendum. It would involve adding a new section to chapter X of the constitution:

The second amendment was to allow the Board of Regents to revise the mission statement of the Northern Marianas College, which would involve amending Section 2 (b) of Article XV.

The third amendment involved making the Attorney General an elected position, which would require amending Article III, section 11 of the constitution.

Results

References

2012 referendums
2012 in the Northern Mariana Islands
Constitutional referendums in the Northern Mariana Islands